S. robustum  may refer to:
 Saccharum robustum, a plant species found in New Guinea
 Sason robustum, a trapdoor spider species only found in southern India, Sri Lanka and the Seychelles
 Sturisoma robustum, a catfish species